Mississippi Central Railroad (reporting mark MSCI) is a short line railroad operating over 51 miles from Oxford, Mississippi, to Grand Junction, Tennessee, owned by Pioneer Railcorp. The railroad's principal commodities are wood products and fertilizer. The MSCI offers connections to the BNSF Railway in Holly Springs and Norfolk Southern Railway in Grand Junction.

In 2013 the Mississippi Central purchased the Redmont Railway.

In 2015 the Mississippi Central purchased the Tishomingo Railroad near Iuka, Mississippi.

Early history (1852–1861)

In 1852, the Mississippi Central Railroad was chartered by the Mississippi Legislature to build a railroad from Canton, Mississippi, to Grand Junction, Tennessee, financed by wealthy cotton planters in La Grange, TN, and Oxford, MS,  passing through the towns of Grenada, Water Valley, Oxford and Holly Springs. The first passenger trains from Holly Springs to Oxford ran in 1857. Passenger service further south to Water Valley began in 1858. On January 31, 1860, the final spike was driven in Winona, Mississippi, establishing the first ever rail link between the Great Lakes and the Gulf of Mexico. The  line was constructed with  track gauge.

Civil War (1861–1865)
In November 1862, General Ulysses S. Grant began the Mississippi Central Railroad Campaign down the line with the ultimate goal of capturing Vicksburg, Mississippi, in conjunction with General William Tecumseh Sherman. Grant established a base in Holly Springs and began advancing south along the railroad. Confederate soldiers built earthwork fortifications to defend the railroad's Tallahatchie River bridge near Abbeville but retreated south without firing a shot when they learned of a flanking maneuver by Grant. Skirmishes were fought along the railroad to Oxford and in the streets of the town itself. The Confederates were pushed further south past Water Valley, Mississippi, but managed to damage a railroad trestle and lead a successful ambush at Oakland, Mississippi, that stalled the Federal advance.

While Grant was stalled, Confederate General Van Dorn lead a successful cavalry raid on Grant's supply base at Holly Springs, burning most of his supplies and then moved north destroying the railroad and telegraph lines along the way. With the railroad destroyed Grant had no way to resupply his army and was forced to end the campaign and retreat to Memphis, TN.

Illinois Central years (1872–1982)

After the Civil War, the Mississippi Central was rebuilt under the guidance of Absolom M. West and eventually the Illinois Central Railroad started to acquire the line in 1872. Illinois Central established their regional headquarters in Water Valley, MS, and based a large maintenance facility there. Famed engineer Casey Jones regularly operated passenger trains along the line and it was said locals could set their watches by him due to his strict adherence to published schedules. In 1927, Illinois Central started to shift traffic to their Grenada-Memphis route and closed the maintenance facility in Water Valley. In 1941, passenger service ended along the route and five years later the regional headquarters was relocated from Water Valley to Jackson, TN. Finally, in 1982, 30 miles of track between Oxford and Bruce Junction in Coffeeville was abandoned and the remaining northern portion of the line sold. Illinois Central continued to operate the southern portion of the line from the junction of the Mississippi and Skuna Valley Railroad to Grenada, MS.

Accidents

On Sunday, October 19, 1862, two passenger trains collided one mile south of Duck Hill Station (near Grenada). Thirty-five passengers (mostly soldiers) were killed and 40-50 others were injured.

The first occurred on February 25, 1870, killed 20 people, and injured 60 when the bridge collapsed. The second accident occurred on June 10, 1928 and injured 42 passengers but resulted in no fatalities.

Present day (1982– )
In March 1982, Kyle Railroad started operating the line under the name Natchez Trace Railway. In 1993, Pioneer Railcorp purchased the line and resurrected the name Mississippi Central Railroad. The primary customer was a particle board plant in Oxford.

In the mid-2000s, all track south of University-Oxford Airport was abandoned and the airport runway expanded over the right of way. MSCI's tracks now end at the airport's perimeter fence. The remaining abandoned right of way has been turned into two different rail trails (Oxford Depot Trail and  South Campus Rail Trail, formerly the Thacker Mountain Rail-Trail) and the Gertrude Ford Parkway in Oxford, MS.

In September 2013, Mississippi Central purchased the former Redmont Railway between Corinth, Mississippi and Red Bay, Alabama. This line is now operated as the Redmont Division.

In February 2016 Roseburg Forest Products, the only user of the railroad south of Holly Springs, announced that it would idle its plant in Oxford, with the last scheduled rail service on March 4.

Motive power
MSCI currently operates four locomotives:
2 EMD GP16s (#1604 & 1605)
1 CF7 (#488)
1 CF7 (#101; still painted as Redmont Railway)

The line ran with steam locomotives until 1953.

Preservation
In 2003, the University of Mississippi completely restored the depot in Oxford. It is now used as a meeting venue.
The depot in Water Valley houses the Casey Jones Museum. An Illinois Central banana reefer and caboose are on display there.
The large passenger depot in Holly Springs has been preserved, and is being considered for use as a meeting venue.
The depot in Winona survives as a restaurant  and gym. A monument in front of the depot commemorates the completion of the Mississippi Central Railroad.

References

Mississippi railroads
Tennessee railroads
5 ft gauge railways in the United States
1852 establishments in Mississippi